John Lynus Zilly (November 11, 1921 – December 18, 2009) was a professional American football player who played end for six seasons for the Los Angeles Rams and the Philadelphia Eagles.

Zilly played right end for Notre Dame on their national championship team in 1943.  During World War II, he served two years in the Navy, fighting in the Pacific. After the war, he  returned to Notre Dame to help guide that team to another national championship in 1946. While Zilly was a sixth round draft pick for the San Francisco 49ers of the All-America Football Conference, he did not play for that team. Instead as a fourth round draft pick for the then-Cleveland Rams in 1945, he played six seasons in the NFL for the L. A. Rams and the 1952 Eagles.  While in California, Zilly also appeared in five movies, the best-known being Twelve O'Clock High.

When his playing career ended, Zilly coached at Montana State, Rhode Island, Notre Dame, for the Eagles, and in the Canadian Football League. On January 8, 1978, Zilly coached the American team to a 22–7 victory over Canada in the first-ever Can-Am Bowl, at Tampa Stadium. His 1978 team consisted of future University of South Florida head coach Jim Leavitt and future Tampa Bay Buccaneers and Washington Redskins general manager, Bruce Allen.

After leaving football, Zilly owned and ran a successful real-estate company until his retirement.

Zilly died on December 18, 2009, in Narragansett, Rhode Island.

Head coaching record

References

External links
 Providence Journal Obituary
 

1921 births
2009 deaths
American football defensive ends
American football ends
Los Angeles Rams players
Philadelphia Eagles players
Philadelphia Eagles coaches
Montana State Bobcats football coaches
Notre Dame Fighting Irish football coaches
Notre Dame Fighting Irish football players
Rhode Island Rams football coaches
United States Navy personnel of World War II
Sportspeople from Waterbury, Connecticut
Players of American football from Connecticut